Cladarosymblema is a genus of prehistoric lobe-finned fish which belonged to the family of Megalichthyidae.

References 

Clement AM, Cloutier R, Lu J, Perilli E, Maksimenko A, Long J. 2021. A fresh look at Cladarosymblema narrienense, a tetrapodomorph fish (Sarcopterygii: Megalichthyidae) from the Carboniferous of Australia, illuminated via X-ray tomography. PeerJ 9:e12597 https://doi.org/10.7717/peerj.12597

Megalichthyiforms
Prehistoric bony fish genera